Abilene Christian University (ACU) is a private Christian university in Abilene, Texas. It was founded in 1906 as Childers Classical Institute. ACU is one of the largest private universities in the Southwestern United States and has one of the 200 largest university endowments in the United States. Affiliated with Churches of Christ, the university is nationally recognized for excellence in service learning, undergraduate research, and undergraduate teaching.

History
Abilene Christian University grew from an idea held by A.B. Barret and Charles Roberson to form a school in West Texas. The Churches of Christ in Abilene agreed to back the project. J.W. Childers sold Barret land and a large house west of the town, and lowered the price with the stipulation that the school would be named in his honor. Childers Classical Institute opened in the fall of 1906, with 25 students.  It initially included a lower school starting in the seventh grade.

When Jesse P. Sewell became president of the institute in 1912, the school began using Abilene Christian College on all its printed material. In 1920, the school paid the Childers family $4,000 and formally changed the name.

The Optimist, the university's student-produced newspaper, was founded in 1912. The Prickly Pear, the school yearbook, was founded in 1916. The campus literary-arts magazine (now The Shinnery Review, formerly The Pickwicker) has been in production since 1933.

In addition, residents donated   of adjoining land. The new campus opened in the fall of 1929.

From the time of its founding to the present, the university has been governed by a board of trustees made up of members of the Churches of Christ.

Abilene Christian College first received school accreditation in 1951, when it became an accredited member of the Commission on Colleges of the Southern Association of Colleges and Schools.

Amberton University, previously Amber University, was created as an extension campus of Abilene Christian University. It was launched in Mesquite, Texas, in 1971, moving to Garland, Texas, in 1974. It became a separate institution as Amber University in 1982, and was rechristened Amberton University in 2001. Like Abilene Christian University, Amberton remains affiliated with the Churches of Christ.

On February 22, 1976, the name of Abilene Christian College was changed to Abilene Christian University. The university celebrated its centennial in the 2005–06 school year. In July 2015, the university signed a lease for an expansion campus located in Addison, Texas. Called ACU Dallas, the new campus began offering several new graduate programs, including an MBA and Ed.D. in organizational leadership.

The school established an NPR station, KACU, in 1986. Initially, the community was concerned that the school might use the station for proselytizing, and for the station's first ten years, an advisory board composed of community members served to monitor the station against this possibility. The JMC Network, a converged student media operation, was created in 2008 to produce all student-led news media. On October 18, 2008, the school hosted a live broadcast of Minnesota Public Radio's long-running A Prairie Home Companion radio show from the campus' Moody Coliseum.

On Wednesday, August 23, 2017, the NCAA Board of Directors voted to pass ACU through to full Division I status, thus making them eligible for postseason play.

Discrimination

The university was officially segregated, for white students only, until 1962, when Billy Curl became the first black student to enroll. The university currently bars employees, but not students, from dating people of the same sex. In 2016 the university recognized an LGBT student association.

Presidents
Allen Booker Barret (1906–08)
H. C. Darden (1908–1909)
Robertson Lafayette Whiteside (1909–1911)
James F. Cox (1911–1912)
Jesse Parker Sewell (1912–1924)
Batsell Baxter (1924–1932)
James F. Cox (1932–1940)
Don H. Morris (1940–1969)
John C. Stevens (1969–1981)
William J. Teague (1981–1991)
Royce Money (1991 – May 31, 2010)
Phil Schubert (June 1, 2010–present)

Accreditation
ACU is institutionally accredited by the Southern Association of Colleges and Schools.  ACU's business programs are professionally accredited by the Association to Advance Collegiate Schools of Business (AACSB International), the Engineering program is accredited by the Engineering Accreditation Commission of ABET, the Social Work programs are accredited by the Council on Social Work Education, the Education programs are accredited by Teacher Education Accreditation Council and the Marriage and Family Therapy programs are accredited by Commission on the Accreditation for Marriage and Family Therapy Education. The Department of Journalism and Mass Communication is accredited by the Accrediting Council on Education in Journalism and Mass Communications. The ACU School of Nursing is accredited by the Commission on Collegiate Nursing Education (CCNE). ACU Graduate School of Theology is accredited by the Association of Theological Schools (ATS).

Academic structure
In 2022, ACU announced major changes to the academic structure that resulted in the creation of three new colleges. While the total number of colleges went unchanged, the reorganization was implemented to assist the University in marketing itself as a national university.

Traditions
 The Prickly Pear. Beginning in 1916, this was the title for Abilene Christian University's (formerly Abilene Christian College) yearbook. The name was taken from Opuntia, a species of cactus native to the Abilene and West Texas area, commonly referred to as "prickly pear".  The Prickly Pear ceased publication in 2009.

 Sing Song. Since 1956, this annual competition in mid-February has featured student groups of 30–100 people, singing themed a cappella medleys, usually satirical. Originating as a fundraiser for the school, the modern event has developed into a major show for which each group assembles costumes related to their act's theme, such as Peter Pan, the British Royal Guard, Coca-Cola, Adam and Eve, or forest fires. Often the costumes involve a mid-performance quick-change to a second costume—such as the 1987 acts in which grapes turned into raisins or bananas peeled to reveal Carmen Miranda—or elaborate choreography within the risers, as when the 1983 freshman class act recreated a Pac-Man screen and manipulated their costumes so that the character appeared to move around the screen. The men of Galaxy and the women of Sigma Theta Chi currently hold the records for most wins of a men's club and women's club, respectively.
 Summit. Referred to as Lectureship until the 2008 school year. Begun in 1918, this annual program gathers thousands of attendees for lectures and workshops on religious topics connected with a biblical theme that changes each year. After many years of following directly after Sing Song, the lectureship moved in 2006 to a September event, in part to spread out the events that bring the most visitors to campus and also to take advantage of the more stable autumn climate, as winter storms and rain had hindered attendance on multiple occasions.
Wildcat Week. Formerly called Welcome Week, this event for the integration of incoming first-year and transfer students provides small-group study programs, social activities, and information fairs in the week preceding the beginning of the fall semester.
Homecoming. Like most residential U.S. universities, the campus hosts a celebration each fall for alumni to return for a parade, class-year and organizational reunions, and musical theater.
Chapel. ACU is one of the few Christian colleges that maintains daily required chapel for all undergraduate, full-time students.  Chapel is a 30-minute praise and worship time, usually with a featured speaker. Typically, no classes or meetings are scheduled during this half-hour. There are, however, opportunities for chapel exemptions that allow students to need less than the standard 55 chapel credits per semester.
School colors. The colors purple and white have long been the colors of ACU, standing for the royalty and purity of Christ, respectively.

Abilene Christian University Press

ACU is one of only seven faith-based institutions with a press. ACU Press, founded in 1983 to print books about Churches of Christ theology, is now a member of the Association of American University Presses, printing books about Christian Higher Education, West Texas History and Christian Living as well as theology. Along with its trade imprint, Leafwood Publishers, the press publishes an average of 36 titles per year. Among its notable authors are Rubel Shelly, Rick Ostrander, Darryl Tippens, Edward Fudge, Larry M. James and Walt McDonald.

Rankings

In the 2022-23 U.S. News & World Report ranking of American colleges and universities, ACU was one of only 19 U.S. institutions ranked in the top 50 nationally in both Undergraduate Research/Creative Projects and Undergraduate Teaching. US News ranks ACU the following among all colleges and universities:

Technology and mobile learning
On February 26, 2008, ACU announced that all incoming freshman classes would receive a free Apple iPhone or an iPod Touch.  This decision was the result of a study to find out the viability of iPhone and iPod for academic purposes. ACU was reported as the first university in the nation to embrace this opportunity to further education through the use of the new generation of smartphone technologies. In February 2009, ACU hosted more than 400 academics and technologists from 31 states and 8 countries for its first ConnectEd Summit on mobile learning. Attendees representing more than 90 schools participated in workshops designed to foster mobile learning programs on their own campuses.

In August 2008, Campus Technology magazine named ACU "Innovator of the Year" in the mobile learning category for this "ACU Connected" initiative. On February 27, 2009, ACU received the award for Institutional Excellence in Information Communications Technology from ACUTA  and on March 4, 2009, Alcatel-Lucent named ACU a Dynamic Enterprise Award winner and awarded ACU with its first Analyst Choice Award for its ACU Connected initiative. On June 13, 2009, the New Media Consortium presented ACU with one of three Center of Excellence awards at its annual summer conference for ACU's efforts in mobile learning.

In August 2022 the ACU applied to the US Nuclear Regulatory Commission (NRC) for a construction licence for a molten salt research reactor for which it plans to achieve criticality by December 2025.

Athletics 

Formerly a charter member of the Division I Southland Conference, Abilene Christian joined the Lone Star Conference (LSC) of Division II of the NCAA in 1973.

In 2012, Abilene Christian received NCAA permission to compete in Division I FCS football and was under consideration for reattachment to the Southland Conference. On August 25, 2012, Abilene Christian's board of trustees accepted Southland's invitation to rejoin the conference effective with the start of the 2013-14 academic year.

In 2021, ACU left the Southland for the Western Athletic Conference.

In 2007, the LSC included 33 ACU current and former student athletes in its 75-member all-sports team commemorating the conference's 75th anniversary. Through 2009, ACU is fourth in NCAA history in team national championships won with 57, trailing Division I schools UCLA, Stanford, and USC, and tied with Division III school Kenyon College.

 The men's track and field program has won 32 NCAA National Track and Field Championships: 19 NCAA outdoor and 13 indoor.
 The women's track and field program has won 22 national championships: 12 indoor and 10 outdoor.
 The Wildcats were NAIA national football champions in 1973 and 1977.
Before the NCAA invalidated its 2007 season, nine ACU football players were included in the LSC's 75th-anniversary list of top players in conference history.  The school's 2007 victories were vacated by the NCAA in 2009.  The NCAA charged "two assistant football coaches helped a pair of players find an English correspondence class to take, enroll in the same course, allowed them to use the coaches' school computers for writing papers and paid to mail the assignments."  The school had scored more than 40 points in 11 of its 13 games and more than 50 points in 7 games and 70 or more points in two games including a 73–76 three overtime loss to Chadron State in the second round of the NCAA playoffs.
 In 2008, the Wildcats "set a record for points in an NCAA (football) playoff game, beating West Texas A&M 93-68 in the second round of the Division II playoffs."
 Ove Johansson kicked the longest field goal in college football history (69 yards) in 1976, 5 yards longer than the current NFL record.   it remains the longest field goal ever kicked in any level of football competition and is an unbroken world record.
 Olympic athletes from ACU include Bobby Morrow, three-time 1956 gold medal winner; Earl Young, 1960 Olympic gold medalist in the 4x400 relay; Billy Olson, who made the 1980 and 1988 U.S. teams but did not compete in 1980 due to President Carter's decision to boycott the Games; Yolande Straughn, who competed in 1988 for Barbados; and James Browne, 1988 competitor for Antigua.
 ESPN and NFL Network analyst and author Sean Adams is a former NCAA All-American athlete for ACU.

Social clubs
The school has a number of student organizations called "social clubs" that are equivalent to a fraternity or sorority on other college campuses; chapters of national Hellenic societies, however, are not permitted. The main goal of these social clubs is to help in service to the surrounding communities and the school itself. Clubs also participate in intramural sports and Sing Song. There are a total of fourteen social clubs for both men and women.

Notable alumni

Academia and Religion 

 Kent Brantly, doctor with the medical mission group Samaritan's Purse; while treating Ebola patients in Liberia, he contracted the virus
 Don Finto, pastor and author in Nashville, Tennessee
 Edward Fudge, theologian
 Jim Gash, eighth president of Pepperdine University
 V. E. Howard, Church of Christ clergyman who started the radio International Gospel Hour, based originally in Texarkana, Texas
 Robert Kelley, 11th president of the University of North Dakota
 H. Jeff Kimble, William L. Valentine Professor and Professor of Physics at the California Institute of Technology
 David Leeson (1978), co-winner of 2004 Pulitzer Prize (previously nominated in 1986, 1990, and 1995) and winner of the Edward R. Murrow and National Headliner Awards
 Dale Martin, New Testament scholar, Professor Emeritus at Yale University
 Barry McCarty, national radio host and former President of Cincinnati Christian University
 Cline Paden (1947), Church of Christ missionary, founder of Sunset International Bible Institute in Lubbock
 Gerald S. Paden, Church of Christ missionary and minister, younger brother of Cline Paden
 Hugh M. Tiner, second president of Pepperdine University
 R. Gerald Turner, president of Southern Methodist University
 Thomas B. Warren, minister, restoration theologian, and religious philosopher
 M. Norvel Young, third president of Pepperdine University
Sally Gary, author and founder of CenterPeace
John W. Pilley, American behavioral psychologist best known for his research into canine cognition and language learning with his Border collie

Business  

 April Anthony, CEO of Homecare Homebase and Encompass Home Health & Hospice chair of the ACU Board of Trustees
Gordon Bethune, former CEO of Continental Airlines
 David Sampson, President and CEO of the Property Casualty Insurers Association of America
 Monty Taylor, cloud computing executive, co-founder of OpenStack
Bill R. Waugh, founder of Taco Bueno

Entertainment and Media  

 Ben Avery, producer of the Tim Dillon Show podcast
 Nelson Coates, Emmy-nominated film production designer; first alumnus to join the Academy of Motion Picture Arts and Sciences
 Chris Christian, record producer, recording artist, songwriter
 Bonnie Curtis, film producer
 Jody Dean, news anchor of KTVT-TV, Dallas, Texas
 Holly Dunn, country music artist, painter
 Ronnie Dunn, singer and songwriter; one half of Brooks & Dunn
 Tracey M. Ferguson, editor of Jet (2017–) and Ebony (2017–)
 Micah P. Hinson, singer and songwriter
Billie Hughes, recording artist and  songwriter
 Daniel Johnston, singer and songwriter – attended ACU in his first year of college
 Stephen Mansfield, author who writes about men's issues, leadership, history and modern culture; has appeared on the New York Times best-seller list
 Max Lucado, best-selling Christian author
 TJ McCloud, singer-songwriter; former member of Stephen Speaks
 Aaron Watson, country music singer
 Zane Williams, country artist
 Big Pokey, rapper
Merritt Tierce, short-story author, story editor, essayist, pro-choice activist, novelist, and television writer.
Jerry Haymes, recording artist, songwriter, producer
Gary G. Hamilton,  television journalist, on-air host, reporter and producer

Politics and Government  

 Jeffrey S. Boyd, Justice of the Texas Supreme Court,
 Janice Hahn, member of the Los Angeles County Board of Supervisors; former member of the United States House of Representatives; former Los Angeles City Councilwoman
Robert Dean Hunter, vice-president emeritus of ACU; member of the Texas House of Representatives, District 71 (1986–2007)
 Robert L. Pitman, lawyer, former United States Attorney; former United States Magistrate Judge; United States federal judge
 Ted Poe, former Harris County, Texas, judge; member of the United States House of Representatives
 Jack Pope, lawyer, judge, and Supreme Court of Texas Chief Justice, 1982–1985
 Jack Scott, California state senator; chancellor, California Community College System
 Joe Shirley (1978), President of Navajo Nation
Lynn Coleman, former United States Deputy Secretary of Energy
Louie Welch, former mayor of Houston,Texas
 Major General Garrett Harencak, Commander of the U.S. Air Force Recruiting Service
General Paul J. Selva, former vice chairman of the Joint Chiefs of Staff representing the U.S. Air Force
Matthew J. Kacsmaryk, United States district judge of the United States District Court for the Northern District of Texas
Brantley Starr, United States district judge of the United States District Court for the Northern District of Texas

Sports  

 Bill Blakeley, former basketball coach at the interscholastic, intercollegiate, and professional levels; ACU Sports Hall of Fame (1992–93)
 James Browne, Olympic long jumper from Antigua
 Randall "Tex" Cobb, professional boxer, actor
 Charles Coody, professional golfer, winner of the 1971 Masters Tournament
 Grant Feasel, former center in the NFL for the Baltimore/Indianapolis Colts, Minnesota Vikings and Seattle Seahawks; ACU Sports Hall of Fame (1994–95)
 Greg Feasel, former offensive tackle in the NFL for the Green Bay Packers and San Diego Chargers; Executive Vice President/Chief Operating Officer for the Colorado Rockies; ACU Sports Hall of Fame (2004–05)
 Taylor Gabriel, professional football player for the Chicago Bears
 James Hill, professional football player for the Seattle Seahawks 
 Ove Johansson, Swedish-born American football fieldgoal record setter, father of Annika Johansson
 Johnny Knox, former professional football player for NFL team Chicago Bears
 John Layfield, professional wrestler
 Clint Longley, former NFL quarterback with the Dallas Cowboys and San Diego Chargers
 Danieal Manning, former professional football player for Chicago Bears, Houston Texans and Cincinnati Bengals
 Lindy McDaniel, former major league relief pitcher
 Cleo Montgomery, former professional football player
 Wilbert Montgomery, former professional football player
 Bobby Morrow, Olympic sprinter, winner of three gold medals in the 1956 Games
 Billy Olson, Olympic pole vaulter (1988 Summer Olympics, U.S. team for boycotted 1980 Summer Olympics); held several world records, including the first 19-foot indoor pole vault; vaulted for Abilene High School and ACU
 Billy Gene Pemelton, Olympic pole vaulter 
 Johnny Perkins, former professional football player
 Raymond Radway, Former professional football player and national champion on the track team
 Daryl Richardson, former professional football player
 Bernard Scott, former professional football player
 Jeev Milkha Singh (1996), professional golfer from India
 Gilbert Tuhabonye, Burundian Championship runner, genocide survivor, and author
 Charcandrick West, professional football player for the Kansas City Chiefs
 Allen Wilson, football coach
 Earl Young, 1960 Olympic gold medal winner in 4x400 relay
Art Briles, former head coach at Baylor University
Rusty Whitt, Head Strength and Conditioning Coach at Troy University
Wes Kittley, head coach of Texas Tech Red Raiders track and field

Faculty

Everett Ferguson, Patristics scholar and noted author
Douglas A. Foster, Professor of Church History, editor of the Stone-Campbell Encyclopedia
Michael A. O'Donnell, former Professor of Family Studies; founding executive director of the Southwest Center for Fathering

Campus

Notes
 When James Cox's wife became ill, his brother, Alonzo B. Cox, filled in for him to finish the term.

References

Bibliography
 Stevens, Dr. John C., No Ordinary University: The History of a City Set on a Hill, Abilene, Texas: Abilene Christian University Press, 1998.  .

External links

 

 
Universities and colleges in Abilene, Texas
Private universities and colleges in Texas
Protestantism in Texas
Seminaries and theological colleges in Texas
Schools in Taylor County, Texas
Council for Christian Colleges and Universities
Education in Taylor County, Texas
Educational institutions established in 1906
1906 establishments in Texas
Universities and colleges accredited by the Southern Association of Colleges and Schools
Universities and colleges affiliated with the Churches of Christ